The 2003 West Virginia Mountaineers football team represented West Virginia University in the 2003 NCAA Division I-A football season. They were led by head coach Rich Rodriguez and played their home games at Mountaineer Field at Milan Puskar Stadium in Morgantown, West Virginia.

They rebounded from a 1–4 start to end the season 8–5 and captured a share of the Big East Conference Championship, the school's first since 1993.  The team earned a trip to the 2004 Gator Bowl, where they lost a rematch to the rival Maryland Terrapins 41–7.

Schedule

References

West Virginia
West Virginia Mountaineers football seasons
Big East Conference football champion seasons
West Virginia Mountaineers football